Brian Paul Conley (born 7 August 1961) is an English actor, comedian, singer and television presenter. Conley has been the host of The Brian Conley Show, as well as presenting the Royal Variety Performance on eight occasions. In his 40-year television career, he has starred in multiple award-winning television sitcoms including Time After Time and The Grimleys. In the West End, he has played the lead role in musicals such as Me and My Girl, Chitty Chitty Bang Bang, Hairspray, Oliver!, The Music Man, Barnum and Jolson for which he was nominated for a prestigious Laurence Olivier Award. As a musician, he has released five albums, including Brian Conley Sings, Let the Good Times Roll, and Stage to Stage. He has won numerous awards in his career including The National Television Award
for Most Popular Comedy Performer, Best Live Performer in Manchester Evening News and a British Comedy Award.

Since 2021, Conley has appeared as Tom "Rocky" Cotton in BBC soap opera EastEnders.

Early life
Conley was born on 7 August 1961 in Paddington, London. His father, Colin, was a taxi driver, later working for the BBC in production as a prop man, including for BBC outside broadcast units. His brother, Alan, is a BBC floor manager, including for Strictly Come Dancing. Conley was brought up in West London and studied Performing Arts at the Barbara Speake Stage School. As a teenager, Conley had a few minor television appearances, including an advert for hot dogs and a small role in a 1977 episode of the science fiction series Survivors. At the age of 16, by lying about his age, Conley started work as a Pontin's Bluecoat.

Career
Conley's first major showbusiness success was fronting a comedy showband called 'Tomfoolery, who performed in pubs and clubs across England and Wales, sometimes as a support act for artists such as Johnny Mathis and the Nolans. The group broke up due to internal disputes when Conley was 19, but his work with the band led to him being talent spotted by agent Bob Voice. As a result of this, Conley started working as a warm-up man for television personalities such as the Krankies, Kenny Everett and Terry Wogan.

Conley's career was then advanced by TVS casting director Bill Hatterley, who secured him onscreen appearances on comedy shows such as Make Me Laugh (1982), The Laughter Show (1984–1985), Live from Her Majesty's (1984–87) and Five Alive (1987). In 1989, with the support of London Weekend Television (LWT)'s light entertainment controller, Conley starred in his own comedy sketch show, Brian Conley: This Way Up. This programme was popular, but not hugely successful.

After two series of the show, Conley made his first appearance in the West End, playing the lead role of Bill Snibson in a production of Me and My Girl.

In 1992, LWT offered him another opportunity to star in his own comedy programme, with The Brian Conley Show. At the suggestion of producer and director Nigel Lythgoe, this new show had a variety format rather than being purely sketches. This different format proved popular, and the show became Britain's most-watched light entertainment programme. Conley's next success was a sitcom entitled Time After Time, in which he played the lead role. The show was named Best ITV Sitcom at the 1994 British Comedy Awards.

Conley played the titular role in Jolson at the Victoria Palace theatre from 1995 to its close in 1997. It won the Olivier award for Best Musical in 1996.

In 1999 he then went on to play the Doug 'Dynamo' Digby, starring opposite Amanda Holden, Nigel Planer and Noddy Holder in The Grimleys. He was also given An Audience with....

Conley recorded a live show in 1996 titled Brian Conley: Alive and Dangerous, which was televised and featured stand-up plus special Nick Frisby/Larry the Loafer and Dangerous Brian sketches. The show was put on VHS and later on DVD.

Around 2000, Conley was given a new show for ITV consisting of chat and music called, once again, The Brian Conley Show. The show lasted for three series. The show's guests included some major Hollywood names like Kathleen Turner and Leslie Nielsen.

Conley also worked at the BBC for a couple of shows. His first being We've Got Your Number, a game show part of a long series of National Lottery game shows. Conley would later return to the BBC to present Let Me Entertain You in 2006.

He has done much stage work, including the parts of Buttons in Cinderella and Caractacus Potts in Chitty Chitty Bang Bang.

In 2006, Conley returned to television, hosting a daytime variety show called Let Me Entertain You, a Lion TV production for BBC Two where 13-year-old operatic baritone Matthew Crane was the first series champion. On 1 December of the same year, he appeared as a guest presenter on The New Paul O'Grady Show on Channel 4, where Larry the Loafer made an appearance in the beginning, and Conley referred himself to "Dangerous Brian" as he was about to enter the "Tank of Doom" as part of a Bushtucker trial.

Later in 2007, Conley presented a second series of Let Me Entertain You on BBC Two, and presented a gameshow, Dirty Rotten Cheater for the BBC. Twenty shows were recorded in May at the Maidstone Studios in Kent.

Conley presented the Midweek Lottery show on BBC One in 2008. On 24 April 2008, Brian took over from ill presenter Paul O'Grady on The Paul O'Grady Show on Channel 4, where he starred once again as 'Dangerous Brian' and he contested against 'Nearly Dangerous Joyce'. Larry the Loafer also made an appearance. On 22 June 2008, Conley performed a cameo role in Last of the Summer Wine as "Boothroyd", Barry's fitness mad neighbour.

He appeared as part of Team Ant on Ant & Dec's Saturday Night Takeaway, and took over from Michael Ball in the musical Hairspray playing the role of Edna Turnblad at London's Shaftesbury Theatre. He also played the same role in the UK Tour of Hairspray, sharing the role with Michael Ball and actor Michael Starke, at selected UK venues. He has also partaken in his own live show, "The Best of Brian Conley", which showcases 'the best' of Conley's material from his past shows, interspersed with occasional showreels of either Larry the Loafer, Dangerous Brian (depending on who Brian is about to come on stage as) or a generic showreel of his work. Like the Brian Conley Show, the stage show invites guests to perform on stage alongside Conley. In 2010, the show went on tour again, covering more areas of the country.

He then played Fagin in Cameron Mackintosh's Oliver! and also finished a West End run as Edna Turnblad in Olivier Award-winning Hairspray. His recent stage career has included lead roles in Chitty Chitty Bang Bang, The Music Man at the Chichester Festival, Brother Love's Travelling Salvation Show (directed and choreographed by Craig Revel Horwood) and Olivier Award-winning Jolson, in which he played Al Jolson.

On 7 November 2012, ITV confirmed that Conley would feature in the 2012 series of I'm a Celebrity...Get Me Out of Here!. On 19 November 2012, Brian left the jungle on medical grounds.

In April 2014, Conley was a contestant on CBBC's Driving Academy programme. In 2014, he hosted a game show for Challenge called Timeline and he presented two series of the daytime BBC show The TV That Made Me in 2015 and 2016.

On 18 August 2017, it was announced that Conley would be taking part in the fifteenth series of Strictly Come Dancing. He was partnered with Welsh professional dancer Amy Dowden. Conley and Dowden were voted off the show in Week 5 after their Jive to Tom Jones' "It's Not Unusual". In February 2021, it was announced that he would be joining the BBC soap opera EastEnders as series regular Terry Cant, the long-lost father of established character Sonia Fowler (Natalie Cassidy).

Personal life
Conley married Anne-Marie on 4 August 1996, in a ceremony at a Stoke Poges chapel, Buckinghamshire. The couple have two daughters, Amy and Lucy.

Film, television and theatre credits

Television

As title star
 Brian Conley: This Way Up (1989–90)
 The Brian Conley Show (1992–95)
 Brian Conley: Alive and Dangerous (1996)
 Brian Conley's Crazy Christmas (1997)
 The Brian Conley Show (2000–02)
 An Audience with... (2002)

As actor
 Survivors (1977) — as Michael, episode 'The Peacemakers'
 Outside Chance (1993, pilot for Time After Time) — as Kenny Conway
 Time After Time (1994–95) — as Kenny Conway
 Privates (1999)
 The Grimleys (1999–2000) — as Doug 'Dynamo' Digby
 Busy Buses (2002) – as the Narrator and the characters
 The Life and Times of Vivienne Vyle (2007) — as Chris Connor
 Last of the Summer Wine (2008) — as Boothroyd, episode 'Enter the Finger'
 EastEnders (2021–present) — as Thomas Cotton

As presenter
 Simply the Best! LWT'S Most Memorable Moments (1998)
 The National Lottery: We've Got Your Number (1999)
 Royal Variety Performance (1999)
 Judgement Day (2003)
 Let Me Entertain You (2006–2007)
 The New Paul O'Grady Show (2006, 2009; 2 episodes as guest presenter)
 Dirty Rotten Cheater (2007)
 Brian Conley's Timeline (2014)
 The TV That Made Me (2015–2016)
 Buy It Now (2018)

As guest/performer
 Make Me Laugh (1982)
 Punchlines! (1983–84, 2 episodes)
 Knees-Up (1983–84)
 The Laughter Show (1984–85)
 Live from Her Majesty's (1984–87, 4 episodes)
 The Keith Harris Show (1985, 1 episode)
 Five Alive (1987)
 Laughs from the Palladium (1987)
 You Bet! (1991, 1 episode)
 Telethon Night Out (1992)
 Royal Variety Performance (1993)
 Surprise Surprise (1993–94, 2 episodes)
 Children in Need (1996)
 Royal Variety Performance (1996)
 Family Fortunes (2001, 1 episode)
 SMTV Gold (2003, 1 episode)
 The Wright Stuff (2005, 1 episode)
 Comic Relief in da Bungalow (2005)
 Dick and Dom in da Bungalow (2006, 1 episode)
 The Best of the Royal Variety (2006)
 Grumpy Old New Year (2006)
 The Wright Stuff (2007–09, 16 episodes)
 Comedy Map of Britain (2007, 1 episode)
 The Grumpy Guide to... Youth Culture (2007)
 Cash in the Celebrity Attic (2008, 1 episode)
 Ant & Dec's Saturday Night Takeaway (2009, 6 episodes)

Conley's appearances on chat shows include Aspel & Company (1993), This Morning (1993 & 2005), Open House with Gloria Hunniford (1998), The New Paul O'Grady Show (2005 & 2009), GMTV (2005), Breakfast (2008), The Alan Titchmarsh Show (2009), The One Show (2009), The 5 O'Clock Show (2010), The Michael Ball Show (2010) and Loose Women (2007–11, various episodes).

Additionally, Conley has appeared as a talking head on many compilation shows and documentaries including: The 100 Greatest Musicals (2003), Bob Monkhouse's Comedy Heroes (2004), Who Killed Saturday Night TV? (2004), The Story of Light Entertainment (2006), 100 Greatest Stand-Ups (2007), 50 Greatest Comedy Catchphrases (2008) and The Nolans: In the Mood for Dancing (2009).

Film
 Cinderella: The Show Must Go On (1986, TV) – as Dandini
 West is West (1987) – as Sue's friend
 Circus (2000) – as Bruno
 Hotel! (2001, TV) – as Inspector Cochrane
 Dream (2001) – as Charlie Allen
 Arthur's Dyke (2001) – as Dave
 Cruise of the Gods (2002) – as self
 Equilibrium (2002) – as Reading Room Proprietor
 Marple: By the Pricking of My Thumbs (2006, TV) – as Eric Johnson
 I Am Bob (2007) – as the Compere

Theatre

Pantomime appearances
 (1978–1979) — Dick Whittington (as Idle Jack), The Hexagon, Reading
 1979–1980 — Robinson Crusoe (as part of Tomfoolery), Swansea Grand Theatre
 1984–1985 — Mother Goose, Churchill Theatre, Bromley
 1989–1990 — Dick Whittington (as a villager), Nottingham Theatre Royal
 1992–1993 — Aladdin, Birmingham Hippodrome
 1993–1994 — Cinderella (as Buttons), The Mayflower Theatre, Southampton
 1997–1998 — Cinderella (as Buttons), The Mayflower Theatre, Southampton
 1998–1999 — Cinderella (as Buttons), Birmingham Hippodrome
 1999–2000 — Cinderella (as Buttons), Theatre Royal, Plymouth
 2001–2002 — Dick Whittington (as Dick Whittington), Birmingham Hippodrome
 2002–2003 — Cinderella (as Buttons), The Mayflower Theatre, Southampton
 2003–2004 — Cinderella (as Buttons), Manchester Opera House
 2004–2005 — Cinderella (as Buttons), Theatre Royal, Plymouth
 2005–2006 — Aladdin (as Aladdin), The Orchard Theatre, Dartford
 2006–2007 — Cinderella (as Buttons), Birmingham Hippodrome
 2007–2008 — Cinderella (as Buttons), Wycombe Swan Theatre, High Wycombe
 2008–2009 — Cinderella (as Buttons), Nottingham Theatre Royal
 2009–2010 — Cinderella (as Buttons), Cliffs Pavilion, Southend-on-Sea
 2010–2011 — Cinderella (as Buttons), The New Theatre, Cardiff
 2011–2012 — Cinderella (as Buttons), Birmingham Hippodrome
 2012–2013 — Robinson Crusoe (as Robinson Crusoe), Birmingham Hippodrome
2013–2014 — Robinson Crusoe (as Robinson Crusoe), The Mayflower Theatre, Southampton
2014–2015 — Cinderella (as Buttons), The Mayflower Theatre, Southampton
2015–2016 — Cinderella (as Buttons), Cliffs Pavilion, Southend-on-Sea
2016–2017 — Robinson Crusoe (as Robinson Crusoe), Cliffs Pavilion, Southend-on-Sea
2017–2018 — Cinderella (as Buttons), Milton Keynes Theatre
2018–2019 — Cinderella (as Buttons), Bristol Hippodrome
2019–2020 – Cinderella (as Buttons), Theatre Royal, Plymouth
2021-2022 – Cinderella (as Buttons), Cliffs Pavilion, Southend-on-Sea

Other roles
Me and My Girl (as Bill Snibson), Adelphi Theatre, 1991.
Jolson (as Al Jolson), Victoria Palace Theatre, 1995–98.
Elton John's Glasses (as Bill), Queen's Theatre, 1998.
Chitty Chitty Bang Bang (as Caractacus Potts), London Palladium, 2005, Palace Theatre, Manchester and Birmingham Hippodrome 2006.
The Music Man (as Professor Harold Hill), Chichester Festival Theatre, 2008.
Hairspray (as Edna Turnblad), Shaftesbury Theatre, 2009–10 and UK tour, 2010.
Brother Love's Travelling Salvation Show (as Brother Love), UK tour, 2011.
Oliver! (as Fagin), UK tour, 2012.
Barnum (as P.T. Barnum), UK Tour, 2014–15
9 to 5 (as Franklin Hart Jr), Savoy Theatre, 2019–20
A Christmas Carol (as Ebenezer Scrooge), Dominion Theatre 2020–21

Discography
 Sings (Columbia, 1993)
 Stage to Stage (Telstar Records, 1996)
 Songs from the Shows (Music Digital, 2002)
 Brian Conley Sings (Sony, 2002)
 Let the Good Times Roll (Universal, 2002)

Videography
 Brian Conley: Alive + Extra Dangerous (Universal, 1996)

Awards and nominations
Awards
 1995 National Television Awards, Most Popular Comedy Performer
 2004 Manchester Evening News Theatre Awards, Most Popular Performer
 2008 TMA Best Performance in a Musical Award (for The Music Man)

Nominations
 1996 Olivier Award for Best Musical Actor (for Jolson)
 2000 National Television Awards, Most Popular Comedy Performer

References

External links
 
 
 
 
 BBC Comedy Guide to Brian Conley: This Way Up 
 BBC Comedy Guide to The Brian Conley Show 

1961 births
Living people
20th-century English comedians
20th-century English male actors
21st-century English comedians
21st-century English male actors
English male comedians
English male film actors
English male singers
English male television actors
English television presenters
I'm a Celebrity...Get Me Out of Here! (British TV series) participants
Male actors from London
People educated at Barbara Speake Stage School
People from Paddington